The Kokang Chinese ( or 果敢族 (Guǒgǎn zú)) are Mandarin-speaking Han Chinese living in Kokang, Myanmar, administered as the Kokang Self-Administered Zone.

Etymology
The name Kokang derives from the Burmese ကိုးကန့်, which itself derives from the Shan ၵဝ်ႈ (kāo, "nine") + ၵူၼ်း (kúun, "family") or ၵၢင် (kǎang, "guard").

Distribution
In 1997, it was estimated that the Kokang Chinese, together with more recently immigrated Han Chinese from Yunnan, China, constituted 30 to 40 percent of Myanmar's ethnic Chinese population. They constitute around 0.1% of Myanmar's population.

History
Most Kokang are descendants of Chinese speakers who migrated to what is now Shan State, Myanmar in the 18th century. In the mid-17th century, the Yang clan, a Chinese military house that fled alongside Ming loyalists from Nanjing to Yunnan, and later migrated to the Shan States in eastern Myanmar, formed a feudal state called Kokang. From the 1960s to 1989, the area was ruled by the Communist Party of Burma, and after the dissolution of that party in 1989 it became a special region of Myanmar.

The Myanmar National Democratic Alliance Army (MNDAA) is a Kokang insurgent group. In August 2009 they clashed with Tatmadaw soldiers in a conflict fanned by controversial interests known as the 2009 Kokang incident, followed by further skirmishes during the 2015 Kokang offensive.

Notable Kokang 
 Lo Hsing Han
 Olive Yang
 Sao Edward Yang Kyein Tsai

See also 
 Chinese people in Myanmar
 Kokang Self-Administered Zone

References 

Kokang